Ralph Coulton  was a 16th century English priest.

Malton was educated at Trinity College, Cambridge.  He was the incumbent at Wormley in Hertfordshire from 1564 to 1570; and Archdeacon of Cleveland from then until his death on 5 May 1582.

References

Alumni of Trinity College, Cambridge
Archdeacons of Cleveland
16th-century English people
1582 deaths